Barbara Komnena is a mythical figure, claimed to be the daughter of the Byzantine emperor Alexios I Komnenos (reigned 1081–1118), and the wife of the Grand Prince of Kiev Sviatopolk II Iziaslavich.

Although she is mentioned in the works of various modern historians such as G. V. Vernadsky, most researchers her a fictional character. Varvara never appears among the four daughters of the emperor: Anna,  Maria, Eudokia and Theodora. She is also never mentioned lists of the members of the  Komnenos dynasty at all. There is no mention of such a marriage in Byzantine sources. The most important text about this era is the Alexiad, written by Alexios I's daughter Anna Komnene, who would have been Varvara's sister, and who does not mention her in the number of her father's children, or as a relative given in marriage to the Russian prince.

Barbara appears in Russian history mainly in connection with the transfer of the relics of her holy patroness, Saint Barbara, from Constantinople to Kiev. According to legend, the relics were given to Barbara as a dowry by her father. These relics, according to tradition, were laid by her in St. Michael's Golden-Domed Monastery, and transferred, after its demolition, to St. Volodimir's Cathedral).

Visiting Kiev in 1656, the Patriarch of Antioch, Macarios III Zaim, heard another legend about the transfer of the relics to Kiev in connection with the marriage of Princess Anna Porphyrogenita to Prince Vladimir the Great. However, it seems most likely that the transfer relics of Saint Barbara's relics to Kiev took place after the Mongol invasion of Rus' and during the decline of the Byzantine Empire.

Notes 

11th-century Byzantine women
12th-century Byzantine women
Family of Alexios I Komnenos
Legendary Russian people
Rurik dynasty